José António Gonçalves da Silva (born 7 February 1975 in Funchal, Madeira), known as Zeca, is a Portuguese former footballer who played as a midfielder.

He spent 13 seasons in the Primeira Liga with C.S. Marítimo, appearing in 216 matches in the competition and scoring three goals.

References

External links

1975 births
Living people
Sportspeople from Funchal
Portuguese footballers
Madeiran footballers
Association football midfielders
Primeira Liga players
Liga Portugal 2 players
Segunda Divisão players
C.S. Marítimo players
C.D. Santa Clara players
C.F. União players
Portugal youth international footballers
Portugal under-21 international footballers